The Italian bombing of Mandatory Palestine in World War II was part of an effort by the Italian Royal Air Force (Regia Aeronautica) to strike at the United Kingdom and its overseas empire throughout the Middle East during World War II.

Background 
On 10 June 1940, the Kingdom of Italy declared war on the French Republic and the United Kingdom. The Italian invasion of France was short-lived and the French signed an armistice with the Italians on 25 June, three days after France's armistice with Germany. This left the British and the forces of the Commonwealth of Nations for the Italians to contend with in the Middle East.

Successively on 19 October 1940, four Italian SM.82s bombers attacked American-operated oil refineries in the British Protectorate of Bahrain, damaging the local refineries. The raid also struck Dhahran in Saudi Arabia, but caused little damage.

Bombing campaign 
Starting in July 1940, the Italian bombings in the British Mandate of Palestine were primarily centered on Tel Aviv and Haifa. However, many other coastal towns such as Acre and Jaffa also suffered.

The last Italian bombing on the territories of the British Mandate of Palestine occurred in June 1941. Haifa and Tel Aviv were hit, but with little damage and few casualties.

Bombing of Haifa 
Haifa was hit many times by the Italians, because of the port and refinery, starting in June 1940.

The 29 July 1940 issue of Time reported a bombing at Haifa by SM82 bombers during the previous week, with a dozen casualties.

According to Time magazine, the Italians claimed a huge success which the British did not deny.

Where the British oil pipeline from Mosul reaches tidewater, "Ten big Italian bombers, flying at great altitude from the Dodecanese Islands, giving the British bases at Cyprus a wide berth, dropped 50 bombs on the Haifa oil terminal and refinery."

The bombing started fires which burned for many days afterwards, and the refinery's production was blocked for nearly one month.

British fighters from a base on Mount Carmel were too late to overtake the Italians returning to their base in Italian Dodecanese.

Bombing of Tel Aviv 
On 9 September 1940, a bombing raid on Tel Aviv caused 137 deaths. There was another raid on Tel Aviv on 12 June 1941 with 13 deaths, done by the Italians or by the French, based in Syria.

Historian Alberto Rosselli pinpointed that the bombing of Tel Aviv that killed 137 people was because the Italian bombers were on their way to the strategic port and refineries of Haifa, but were intercepted by British aircraft. Forced to go back, the Italians received orders to drop their bombs on the port of Tel Aviv, but in attempting to avoid the attacking British planes they dropped the bombs by mistake on a civilian area near the port.

Gallery

See also 

 Italian Royal Air Force (Regia Aeronautica)
 Bombing of Bahrain in World War II

Footnotes 

1940 in Mandatory Palestine
1941 in Mandatory Palestine
Conflicts in 1940
Conflicts in 1941
Explosions in 1940
Explosions in 1941
Palestine
Palestine
Middle East theatre of World War II
World War II strategic bombing conducted by Italy
Italian bombing of Mandatory Palestine in World War II
Military history of Mandatory Palestine in World War II
Airstrikes conducted by Italy
Italy–United Kingdom relations